Trachysomus cavigibba is a species of beetle in the family Cerambycidae. It is known to inhabit Bolivia.

References

Onciderini
Beetles described in 1975